A dagger is a short-bladed weapon.

Dagger may also refer to:

Places
 Daggar, Pakistan
 Dagger Complex, a US military base in Darmstadt, Germany

Arts, entertainment, and media
 Dagger (comics), a superhero in the Marvel Comics Universe
 Dagger Awards, by the Crime Writers' Association (CWA)
 Garnet Til Alexandros XVII or Dagger, a character in the video game Final Fantasy IX

Mathematics
 , conjugate transpose matrix
 Dagger category in category theory
 , logical NOR operator or Quine's dagger

Vehicles
 IAI Nesher, Israeli aircraft, Dagger in Argentine service
 Dennis Dagger, a fire engine

Other uses
 †, dagger (mark) or obelus, typographical symbol
 Daggering, a Jamaican dance form
 The Daggers, Dagenham & Redbridge F.C., an English football club

See also
 Athame, a ceremonial blade
Daggers (disambiguation)
 The Dagger (disambiguation)
 Double dagger (disambiguation)
Kinzhal (missile)